The 2003–04 La Liga season, the 73rd since its establishment, started on 30 August 2003 and finished on 23 May 2004. Valencia were crowned champions for the 6th time in their history.

Teams
Twenty teams competed in the league – the top seventeen teams from the previous season and the three teams promoted from the Segunda División. The promoted teams were Murcia, Zaragoza and Albacete, returning to the top flight after an absence of fourteen, one and seven years respectively. They replaced Recreativo, Alavés and Rayo Vallecano after spending time in the top flight for one, five and four years respectively.

Team information

Clubs and locations

2003–04 season was composed of the following clubs:

(*) Promoted from Segunda División.

League table

Results

Overall
Most wins – Valencia (23)
Fewest wins – Murcia (5)
Most draws – Osasuna (15)
Fewest draws – Espanyol (4)
Most losses – Murcia (22)
Fewest losses – Valencia (7)
Most goals scored – Real Madrid (72)
Fewest goals scored – Murcia (29)
Most goals conceded – Celta de Vigo (68)
Fewest goals conceded – Valencia (27)

Awards

Pichichi Trophy

The Pichichi Trophy is awarded to the player who scores the most goals in a season.

Fair Play award

Valencia was the winner of the Fair-play award with 99 points.

Pedro Zaballa award
Joan Laporta (Barcelona president) and José María Alanís (CD Siempre Alegres footballer)

Hat-tricks

 4 Player scored 4 goals

See also
 2003–04 Segunda División
 2003–04 Copa del Rey

References

La Liga seasons
1
Spain